Belderrig is a small village on the North Mayo coast, and lies within the Céide Fields complex, a prehistoric landscape of field systems and related domestic and ritual structures dating to the Neolithic and Bronze Age. The excavations at Belderrig were initiated by Graeme Warren, School of Archaeology, University College Dublin, Ireland, after visiting the site in 2003 with its discoverer, the archaeologist Seamas Caulfield.

The excavations took place directly on the low cliff on the east side of Belderrig Harbour by a large erosion scar, and continued uphill. The excavations uncovered a series of Mesolithic platforms and stony layers, with Mesolithic activity dating from around 4500 cal. BC, with a range of dates into the Neolithic, with a final date of around 2500 cal. BC. As well as the Mesolithic stony platforms and layers, the excavations uncovered a series of pits, and prehistoric field walls related to the Céide Fields complex. The stone tool assemblage is dominated by vein quartz artefacts, with a smaller amount of flint and siltstone.

References

External links
 Analysis of the quartz lithics from the Belderrig site

Mesolithic sites of Europe
Neolithic sites of Europe
Archaeological sites in County Mayo
Prehistoric sites in Ireland
4th-millennium BC architecture